Enugala Peddi Reddy is an Indian politician. He was elected to the Andhra Pradesh Legislative Assembly from Huzurabad in the 1994 and 1999 Andhra Pradesh Legislative Assembly election as a member of the Telugu Desam Party. He was sworn in as Minister of State in N. Chandrababu Naidu  cabinet from October 1999 to May 2004.

In June 2019, Reddy along with TRS leader A. P. Jithender Reddy, D. K. Aruna, who was a Minister in Andhra Pradesh and former Congress MLC, P. Sudhakar Reddy joined the Bharatiya Janata Party.

References

Living people
State cabinet ministers of Andhra Pradesh
People from Karimnagar district
1957 births
Members of the Andhra Pradesh Legislative Assembly
Telugu Desam Party politicians
Praja Rajyam Party politicians
Bharatiya Janata Party politicians from Telangana